Aryadan Shoukath is both an award-winning Indian film producer, and an award-winning local state politician. He is the son of Indian National Congress leader, Aryadan Muhammed, (the former Kerala State Minister of Electricity).

Shoukath is the highest-profile cultural and political personality in Nilambur municipality (formerly, panchayat). He was the president of the Nilambur  panchayat when it won Kerala's best panchayat award from the state government, and was the chairman of the municipality.

His first film in 2003, Paadam Onnu: Oru Vilapam, was an indictment of Muslim orthodoxy on girls' education. It won 15 awards, including the National Film Award for Family Welfare and the Best Asian  Film Award at the Madrid Festival. His latest film, Vilapangalkkappuram,  relates the story of a girl who flees the notorious anti-Muslim riots in Gujarat to come to Kerala.

References

Film producers from Kerala
Malayalam film producers
Indian Muslims
Living people
People from Malappuram district
Year of birth missing (living people)